Grand Prix motorcycle racing is the premier championship of motorcycle road racing, which has been divided into three classes since 1990: 125cc, 250cc and MotoGP. Classes that have been discontinued include 350cc, 50cc/80cc and sidecar. The Grand Prix Road-Racing World Championship was established in 1949 by the sport's governing body, the Fédération Internationale de Motocyclisme (FIM), and is the oldest motorsport World Championship. The 350cc class existed from 1949 until 1982. The 350cc referred to the size of the engines of the motorcycles that participated in the class. The engines had four cylinders, similar to the types of engines used in MotoGP today.

Each season consisted of 5 to 12 Grands Prix contested on closed circuits, as opposed to public roads. Points earned in these events counted toward the drivers' and constructors' world championships. The driver's and constructor's championship were separate championships, but were based on the same point system. The points systems used in the championship varied over the years. The first championship in 1949 awarded 10 points to the race winner with 8, 7, 6 and 5 points from second place to fifth place, a point was also awarded for the rider who completed the fastest lap. The last championship in 1982 awarded 15 points for a win, with 12, 10, 8, 6, 5, 4, 3, 2, and 1 point from second place to tenth place. Results from all Grands Prix counted towards the championships; however, in some seasons only a certain number of results were counted.

Giacomo Agostini won the most championships with seven during his career. Jim Redman won the second most championships with four and John Surtees the third most with three championships. Johnny Cecotto is the youngest rider to have won the championship: he was 19 years old when he won in 1975. British riders won the most championships; eight riders won a total of 14 championships. Italian riders were second with eight championships between two riders and Rhodesians were third with five championships. MV Agusta was the constructor that riders won the most championships with; they won ten championships. Honda was second with six and Moto Guzzi third with five. Freddie Frith won the inaugural championship in 1949. Anton Mang was the last champion before the class was discontinued in 1982.

Winners

 The "Season" column refers to the season the competition was held, and wikilinks to the article about that season.
 The "Margin" column refers to the margin of points by which the winner defeated the runner-up.

By season

Multiple champions

By constructor

By nationality

Footnotes

A.  John Surtees and Gary Hocking finished the 1960 championship tied on 22 points. Surtees was declared the winner by virtue of having more third-place finishes than Hocking, as they were tied on first and second places finishes.

References
General
 
 

Bibliography
 
 

Specific

350cc World Champions
Moto 350